Thomas Crawley (died 1559), of Elmdon and Wenden Lofts, Essex, was an English politician.

He was a Member (MP) of the Parliament of England for Aylesbury in 1559.

References

Year of birth missing
1559 deaths
English MPs 1559
People from Uttlesford (district)